Królikowo may refer to the following places:
Królikowo, Kuyavian-Pomeranian Voivodeship (north-central Poland)
Królikowo, Pomeranian Voivodeship (north Poland)
Królikowo, Warmian-Masurian Voivodeship (north Poland)